Uffrainkhal is a village located in the midst of three districts Pauri, Chamoli and Almora in the Indian state of Uttarakhand.

References 

Villages in Pauri Garhwal district